Giants of the Organ in Concert is a live album by American jazz organists Jimmy McGriff and Groove Holmes recorded in Boston in 1973 and originally released on the Groove Merchant label as a double LP.

Track listing
All compositions by Jimmy McGriff and Groove Holmes
 "The Preacher's Tune" – 11:05
 "Bean's" – 6:47
 "Mozambique" – 15:52
 "Closing Theme" – 2:32
 "Brown Bread" – 9:45
 "Talk to Me" – 10:52
 "Boston Whaler" – 12:52
 "Chopper" – 8:53

Personnel
Groove Holmes, Jimmy McGriff – organ
Leon Cook, Mark Elf, O'Donel Levy – guitar
Mike Moss – drums
Kwasi Jayourba – percussion

References

Groove Merchant live albums
Jimmy McGriff live albums
Richard Holmes (organist) live albums
1973 live albums
Albums produced by Sonny Lester